Ternovoy is a rural locality (a khutor) in Manoylinskoye Rural Settlement, Kletsky District, Volgograd Oblast, Russia. The population was 115 as of 2010.

Geography 
Ternovoy is located 48 km south of Kletskaya (the district's administrative centre) by road. Manoylin is the nearest rural locality.

References 

Rural localities in Kletsky District